Frédéric Vieillot (born 7 September 1990) is a French football striker who is currently a free agent after being released by Troyes in 2011. During the 2010–11 season, he had a loan spell with Championnat National side Beauvais.

External links
Frédéric Vieillot profile at foot-national.com

1990 births
Living people
Sportspeople from Saint-Germain-en-Laye
French footballers
Association football forwards
ES Troyes AC players
AS Beauvais Oise players
Ligue 2 players
Footballers from Yvelines